The 1918–19 Swiss National Ice Hockey Championship was the ninth edition of the national ice hockey championship in Switzerland. HC Bellerive Vevey won the championship by defeating HC Bern in the final.

First round

Eastern Series 
HC Bern qualified for the final.

Western Series

Group 1

Group 2

Western Final 
 HC Bellerive Vevey - Genève-Servette HC 3:1

Final 
 HC Bellerive Vevey - HC Bern 2:0

External links 
Swiss Ice Hockey Federation – All-time results

National
Swiss National Ice Hockey Championship seasons